Nigeria–Russia relations are the bilateral foreign relations between Nigeria and Russia. Russia has an embassy in Lagos and a representative office in Abuja, and Nigeria has an embassy in Moscow.

The current Ambassador of Russia to Nigeria is Alexey Shebarshin.

Background

Diplomatic relations between Nigeria and the Soviet Union were established on 25 November 1960. During the Nigerian Civil War between 1967 and 1970, the USSR provided the Nigerian government with political and military assistance. Nigeria and the newly formed Russian Federation established diplomatic relations in 1991.

High level visits
In March 2001, the President of Nigeria Olusegun Obasanjo visited Moscow. During that visit, Vladimir Putin and Olusegun Obasanjo signed the declaration “On the Principles of Friendly Relations and Partnership Between the Russian Federation and the Federal Republic of Nigeria”, as well as a program of cooperation in bilateral and international formats between Russia and Nigeria. On June 24, 2009 Russian President Dmitry Medvedev made an official visit to Nigeria as part of a 3 nation tour of Africa. It was the first visit by any Russian leader to Nigeria.

Military cooperation
In 2017, Russia and Nigeria signed an agreement on military cooperation. Nigeria is interested in buying Russian military equipment. Nigeria has already signed a contract for the purchase of Mi-35 helicopters, six of which have already been delivered. In August 2021, Nigeria and Russia signed an agreement for the Russian Armed Forces to train and supply the Nigerian Armed Forces. It was signed in Moscow by Nigerian Minister of Defence Bashir Salihi Magashi and Russian FSVTS Director Dmitry Shugaev.

Ambassadors

Russia to Nigeria

Nigeria to Russia 

 George T. Kurubo (12 August 1967-1973)

 Hamzat Ahmadu (1975–1978)
 Abdullahi Sarki Mukhtar (January 23, 2002-May 30, 2003)
 Dan Suleiman (2006-September 18, 2008)
 Timothy Shelpidi (September 18, 2008-October 14, 2011)
 Steve Davies Ugbah (2018-2021)
 Abdullahi Yibaikwal (2021-present)

References

External links 

  Documents on the Nigeria–Russia relationship from the Russian Ministry of Foreign Affairs
  Embassy of Russia in Lagos
 Embassy of Nigeria in Moscow

 
Africa–Russia relations
Russia
Bilateral relations of Russia